Miguel Ángel Rubio Lestán (born 11 March 1998), known as Miguel Ángel, is a Spanish footballer who plays as a central defender for Granada CF.

Club career
Born in Leganés, Madrid, Miguel Ángel finished his formation with Getafe CF. On 27 August 2017 he made his senior debut with the reserves, starting in a 2–1 Tercera División home win against CF Pozuelo de Alarcón.

Miguel Ángel scored his first senior goal on 15 October 2017, netting the opener in a 3–0 home defeat of CD San Fernando de Henares. The following 6 May he made his first team – and La Liga – debut, coming on as a second-half substitute for fellow debutant David Alba in a 1–0 away win against UD Las Palmas.

On 14 June 2019, Miguel Ángel signed a new four-year contract with Geta. On 25 July, he was loaned out to newly promoted Segunda División club CF Fuenlabrada in a season-long deal.

On 31 January 2020, after only one Copa del Rey match for Fuenla, Miguel Ángel's loan was terminated. On 14 February, he joined Real Valladolid's B-team on loan for the remainder of the season; on 18 August, his loan was renewed for a further year.

On 20 August 2021, Miguel Ángel moved to Burgos CF in the second division on a season-long loan deal. On 26 July of the following year, he signed a permanent three-year deal with Granada CF in the same tier.

References

External links

1998 births
Living people
People from Leganés
Spanish footballers
Footballers from the Community of Madrid
Association football defenders
Association football midfielders
La Liga players
Segunda División B players
Tercera División players
Getafe CF B players
Getafe CF footballers
CF Fuenlabrada footballers
Real Valladolid Promesas players
Real Valladolid players
Burgos CF footballers
Granada CF footballers